Integral Autonomy (AI) was a regionalist Christian-democratic Italian political party based in Trentino.

History
In 1982 the Trentino Tyrolean People's Party (PPTT) broke up: the more conservative wing formed the Trentino Tyrolean Autonomist Union (UATT), while the more centrist wing formed Integral Autonomy, under the leadership of the longstanding leader of the PPTT Enrico Pruner.

In the 1983 provincial election Integral Autonomy won only 3.1% of the vote, while Franco Tretter's UATT the much higher 8.2%.

In 1988 the two parties merged into the Trentino Tyrolean Autonomist Party, which gained 9.9% in the subsequent provincial election.

References

Sources
"Autonomists in Trentino", an essay by Franco Panizza 
Provincial Council of Trento – Legislatures
Trentino Alto-Adige Region – Elections
Provincial Government of Trento – Elections
Cattaneo Institute – Archive of Election Data
Parties and Elections in Europe – Province of Trento
Ministry of the Interior – Historical Archive of Elections

Political parties in Trentino
Christian democratic parties in Italy
Catholic political parties